The Kaingang (also spelled caingangue in Portuguese or kanhgág in the Kaingang language) people are an Indigenous Brazilian ethnic group spread out over the three southern Brazilian states of Paraná, Santa Catarina and Rio Grande do Sul and the southeastern state of  São Paulo. They are also called Caingang and Aweikoma, though the Kaingang and Aweikoma (Xokleng) are now considered separate groups. The Kaigang people were the original first inhabitants of the province of Misiones in Argentina. Their language and culture is quite distinct from the neighboring Guaraní.

It has been stated that the Kaingang rarely live long in one place causing them to move a lot, but some sources, such as Juracilda Veiga and ethnographic registers (José Francisco Tomás do Nascimento 1886, Telêmaco Borba 1908 etc.), indicate that Kaingang groups have a crucial relation with the land where they were born and their ancestors were buried.

The Kaingang language is a member of the Jê family.

Copel agreement
In November 2006 Brazil's state-owned power company, Copel, agreed to compensate the group 6.5 million dollars for operating a small hydro plant in the Apucaraninha Reservation. The company finally gave in to a settlement after the natives carried two barrels full of fuel into the plant's machine room and threatened to destroy the plant.

This is part of a larger trend of indigenous groups challenging energy projects according to Platts.

See also
Indigenous people of Brazil

Footnotes
Murdock, 1949.

Citations

References
 

Indigenous peoples in Brazil